Björn Dreyer (born 27 July 1977) is a German former professional footballer who played as a midfielder.

Career
Dreyer made his debut in the Bundesliga for SC Freiburg on 28 August 1999 when he came on as a substitute in the 76th minute in a game against 1860 Munich.

References

External links
 

1977 births
Living people
Footballers from Hamburg
German footballers
Association football midfielders
Bundesliga players
SC Concordia von 1907 players
FC Eintracht Norderstedt 03 players
SC Freiburg players
SC Freiburg II players
Stuttgarter Kickers players